The 2017 Shenzhen Open (known as 2017 Shenzhen Gemdale Open for sponsorship reason) was a tennis tournament played on outdoor hard courts. It was the fifth edition of the Shenzhen Open, and part of the WTA International tournaments of the 2017 WTA Tour. It took place at the Shenzhen Longgang Sports Center in Shenzhen, China, from 1 to 7 January 2017.

Points and prize money

Point distribution

Prize money

1 Qualifiers prize money is also the Round of 32 prize money
* per team

Singles main draw entrants

Seeds

1 Rankings as of December 26, 2016.

Other entrants
The following players received wildcards into the singles main draw:
  Duan Yingying
  Zhang Kailin
  Zhu Lin

The following players received entry using a protected ranking:
  Galina Voskoboeva

The following players received entry from the qualifying draw:
  Chang Kai-chen
  Ons Jabeur
  Nina Stojanović
  Stefanie Vögele

The following players received entry as a Lucky loser:
  Ana Bogdan
  Liu Fangzhou

Withdrawals
Before the tournament
  Anna-Lena Friedsam → replaced by  Maria Sakkari
  Yaroslava Shvedova → replaced by  Liu Fangzhou
  Timea Bacsinszky → replaced by  Ana Bogdan

Doubles main draw entrants

Seeds

1 Rankings as of December 26, 2016.

Other entrants 
The following pairs received wildcards into the doubles main draw:
  Ma Shuyue /  Zhang Kailin
  Duan Yingying /  Wang Qiang

Champions

Singles

  Kateřina Siniaková def.  Alison Riske, 6–3, 6–4

Doubles

  Andrea Hlaváčková /  Peng Shuai def.  Raluca Olaru /  Olga Savchuk, 6–1, 7–5

References

External links
Official website

2017 WTA Tour
2017 in Chinese tennis
2017
January 2017 sports events in China